Aase Winther (née Aase Svendsen) is a former Danish badminton player.

Career
Aase Winther won the Women's Doubles title at the Danish national championships four times. Her partners were Kirsten Thorndahl in 1949, Anni Jorgensen in 1955 and Birgit Anker Hansen in 1956 and 1960.
She reached the All England Open Badminton Championships singles final in 1949. and represented Denmark at the 1960 Uber Cup.

References

Danish female badminton players
Year of birth missing (living people)
Living people